Alke Overbeck (born 7 August 1988) is a German female canoeist who won 22 medals at senior level at the Wildwater Canoeing World Championships and European Wildwater Championships.

References

External links
 Alke Overbeck at ICF 

1988 births
Living people
German female canoeists
Place of birth missing (living people)